Five vessels of the British Royal Navy have been named HMS Frolic.

 The first  was an 18-gun 384 ton brig-sloop in service from 1806 to 1813. See also Capture of HMS Frolic.
 The second  was a 10-gun 236 ton brig-sloop launched in 1820 and sold 1838.
 The third  was a 16-gun 511 ton sloop launched in 1842 and sold 1864.
 The fourth  was a composite screw gunboat launched in 1872. Converted to a drillship in 1888. Renamed WV.30 on conversion to a Coastguard watchvessel in 1893 and renamed WV.41 in 1897. Sold in April 1908.

References

Royal Navy ship names